Electoral results for the district of Cumberland may refer to several former districts in Australia:

 Electoral results for the district of Cumberland Boroughs, New South Wales (1856–1859)
 Electoral results for the district of Cumberland (North Riding), New South Wales (1856–1859)
 Electoral results for the district of Cumberland (South Riding), New South Wales (1856–1859)
 Electoral results for the district of Cumberland (New South Wales) (1920–1927)